Bulbophyllum sect. Acrochaene is a section of the genus Bulbophyllum.

Description
Species in this section are creeping rhizomatous epiphytes with a single flower with 3 vein petals and 4 pollinas

Distribution
Plants from this section are found from India to Vietnam and South to Thailand.

Species
Bulbophyllum section Acrochaene comprises the following species:

References

Orchid subgenera